Captain Guy D'Oyly-Hughes DSO & Bar, DSC (8 August 1891 – 8 June 1940) was an officer in the Royal Navy.

Service career

Early life 
Guy D'Oyly-Hughes was born in 1891 in Salt Lake City, Utah, United States, the son of Samuel Hughes, a British physician, and Kezia D'Oyly Hughes. At the age of nine, he was sent to Britain to complete his education, followed by his parents in 1901. They eventually settled in Southampton. D'Oyly-Hughes married Anne Margaret Gladys Crawford, with whom he had two daughters.

First World War
He was awarded the Distinguished Service Cross in June 1915 after a patrol in which his captain, Lieutenant Commander Martin Nasmith, was awarded the Victoria Cross. D'Oyly-Hughes was awarded the Distinguished Service Order after swimming ashore from E11 with explosives and blowing up part of the Constantinople-Baghdad Railway on 21 August 1915.

Second World War and death
In June 1939, as a captain, he was given command of the aircraft carrier . D'Oyly-Hughes had learned to fly and continually rejected the advice of the ship's professional aviators, according to Winton. All three British ships were sunk with the loss of at least 1,533 lives. D'Oyly-Hughes went down with his ship.

Glorious had been sighted in conditions of maximum visibility, a condition in which an aircraft carrier would normally have one or more aircraft out on a Combat Air Patrol.  Glorious had no such patrol, and was unable to reach maximum speed before coming in range of the enemy's 11-inch guns.  Winton describes D'Oyly-Hughes' lack of belief in the effectiveness of air patrols and the questions raised by numerous commentators, including eyewitnesses from Glorious and Scharnhorst, about the captain's judgement in this and other matters.

See also
Hansard report on the debate "HMS Glorious" in the House of Commons on 28 January 1999.

References

Bibliography

1891 births
Military personnel from Utah
1940 deaths
Royal Navy submariners
Royal Navy officers of World War I
Royal Navy officers of World War II
Royal Navy personnel killed in World War II
People lost at sea
Companions of the Distinguished Service Order
Recipients of the Distinguished Service Cross (United Kingdom)
Military personnel from Salt Lake City
Captains who went down with the ship
British expatriates in the United States